Nassauvia gaudichaudii, the coastal nassauvia, is a species of flowering plant in the family Asteraceae. It is found only in Falkland Islands. Its natural habitats are temperate shrubland, rocky areas, and rocky shores.

References

Nassauvieae
Flora of the Falkland Islands
Least concern plants
Taxonomy articles created by Polbot